The Golden Garden  is a 2019 South Korean television series starring Han Ji-hye, Lee Sang-woo, Oh Ji-eun and Lee Tae-sung. It aired four episodes every Saturday on MBC TV from 20:45 to 23:10 (KST), from July 20 to October 26, 2019.

Synopsis
The story of four individuals who become involved with each other during a legal case.

Cast

Main
 Han Ji-hye as Eun Dong-joo
 Lee Sang-woo as Cha Pil-seung
 Oh Ji-eun as Sabina / Eun Dong-joo 
 Lee Tae-sung as Choi Joon-ki

Supporting

People around Dong-joo
 Jung Si-ah as Oh Mi-joo

People around Pil-seung
 Kim Young-ok as Kang Nam-doo
 Yeon Je-hyung as Lee Gi-yeong

People around Sabina
 Jung Young-joo as Sin Nam-sook

People around Joon-ki
 Cha Hwa-yeon as Jo Nam-hee
 Kim Yu-seok as Choi Dae-seong
 Jo Mi-ryung as Han Soo-mi

Others
 Baek Seung-hee as Seo Hye-yeong
 Kang Joon-hyuk as Lee Mit-eum
 Jung Seo-yeon as Lee Sa-rang
 Moon Ji-yoon as Lee Seong-wook

Production
 The first script reading took place in May 2019.
 Han Ji-hye and Lee Sang-woo previously starred together in Marry Me Now (2018).
 Han Ji-hye and Lee Tae-sung previously starred together in Pots of Gold (2013).

Ratings
 In this table,  represent the lowest ratings and  represent the highest ratings.
 NR denotes that the drama did not rank in the top 20 daily programs on that date.
 N/A denotes that the rating is not known.
 Each night's broadcast is divided into four 35-minute episodes with three commercial breaks in between.

Notes

References

External links
  
 
 

Korean-language television shows
MBC TV television dramas
South Korean legal television series
2019 South Korean television series debuts
2019 South Korean television series endings
Television series by Kim Jong-hak Production